A by-election was held for the New South Wales Legislative Assembly electorate of Ashfield on 5 October 1929 because of the resignation of Milton Jarvie.

Sir Colin Davidson, a Judge of the Supreme Court, was appointed to conduct a Royal Commission to investigate whether there were attempts at bribery with an application for a Campsie bus service. On 7 June 1929 the Royal Commission reported its findings, including that Jarvie had attempted to bribe Albert Bruntnell who was the Chief Secretary. Jarvie was charged with criminal offences, however on 1 July 1929 he was found not guilty. Jarvie nonetheless resigned so that the electors of Ashfield could return him with an overwhelming majority.

Dates

Result

A Royal Commission reported that Jarvie had attempted to bribe the Chief Secretary, however in the following month he was found not guilty of criminal charges. Jarvie subsequently chose to resign and re-contest the seat.

See also
Electoral results for the district of Ashfield
List of New South Wales state by-elections

References

1929 elections in Australia
New South Wales state by-elections
1920s in New South Wales